Nether region may refer to:

 Hell, the Underworld, or any place of darkness or eternal suffering
 Subterranea (geography) 
 Euphemism or slang for the buttocks, groin and genitals of human body, separately or collectively

See also 
Hell (disambiguation)
Netherlands (disambiguation)
Netherworld (disambiguation)
Spirit world (disambiguation)